Solomiia Bobrovska (born 20 December 1989) is a Ukrainian politician and civic activist, member of the Verkhovna Rada of Ukraine since 2019, and former acting Governor of Odesa region during 2016–2017.

Education 
2007-2012 - Ivan Franko National University of Lviv, Philosophy Faculty, Master's degree. Currently, she is doing her Ph.D. on the topic "Freedom as a source of social and legal legitimation of the civil society".

Graduate of the Institute of Civic Leadership.

Graduate of the joint project of the Laboratory of the Legislative Initiatives and the Council of Europe - Ukrainian School of Political Studies.

Civic activity 
Starting 2002 is a member of the national scout organisation Plast

Starting 2009 is a member of the NGO "Foundation of Regional Initiatives".

An activist of the civic movement "Chesno. Filtrui Radu!"() - which means "Honestly. Filter Rada!". Co-founder of the Euromaidan SOS and Help to the SBGSU.

Professional experience 
In 2010 as a part of the Canada-Ukraine Parliamentary Program interned in the Parliament of Canada at the office of Andrew Kania.

In 2012-2014 and in January–June 2015 was a project manager at the Centre of Civil Liberties.

In April–December 2014 served as an advisor to the Vice Prime Minister of Ukraine Oleksandr Sych.

From October 2015 through April 2016 served as an advisor to the Governor of Odesa Region Mikheil Saakashvili.

April 2016-January 2017 served as a Deputy Governor of Odesa Region.

9 November 2016 was appointed the Acting Governor of Odesa Region. Being 26 at the moment of appointment, she became the youngest Governor in Ukraine's history. Acted as the Governor through 12 January 2017.

September–November 2017 completed a fellowship at the Massachusetts Caucus of Women Legislators (Boston, USA).

2018-2019 served as a Head of the NGO "Ukrainian Core" and focused on the Women Political Interaction Studies Project for women of Southern and Eastern Ukraine.

Political activity 
One of the core members in the team of Svyatoslav Vakarchuk who initiated the Holos Party. She was a candidate at the parliamentary election in 2019, №9 in the party lists. In the election, Holos won 5.82% of the vote, 17 MPs elected nationwide and three MPs elected in a constituency.

Serves as a Secretary of the Parliamentary Committee on Foreign Affairs and Inter-parliamentary Cooperation.

Serves as a Deputy Head of Ukrainian Delegation to the NATO PA.

Serves as a Co-Head of the Latvia-Ukraine Parliamentary Friendship Group.

On 29 July 2021 Holos expelled Bobrovska from the party, the party claimed she could not be part in their "political force in the future". Earlier that day she herself had written a statement to leave the party; declaring dissatisfaction with Kira Rudyk's control over the party.

References 

1989 births
Living people
Politicians from Rivne
University of Lviv alumni
Ukrainian women activists
Governors of Odesa Oblast
Ninth convocation members of the Verkhovna Rada
Voice (Ukrainian political party) politicians
21st-century Ukrainian women politicians
21st-century Ukrainian politicians
Women members of the Verkhovna Rada